Te Kani-a-Takirau  ( 1790s –  1856) was a notable New Zealand tribal leader. Of Māori descent, he identified with Hapu Matua of the Te Aitanga A Hauiti Iwi. He was born in on the East Coast of New Zealand. He is well known for having refused to sign the Treaty of Waitangi in 1840.

Ancestry 
NB: This section is derived from text in  available here at the New Zealand Electronic Text Centre.

Te Kani-a-Takirau was born at the close of the eighteenth century. He was descended from Konohi, who lived at Whangara, and whose principal wife was Hinekino. Their eldest son, Marakauiti, (not to be confused with the Māori youth of the same name who was one of the guests aboard HMS Endeavour in Poverty Bay) had two wives, and his brother, Te Rewai, was the husband of three women. With Puhinga, his principal wife, Marakauiti fathered Tane Tokorangi. When Tane reached manhood, Konohi had a quarrel with Rerekohu, another East Coast chief. As a peace offering Rerekohu handed over to Konohi two women of high rank, one being Ngunguru, who was given to Tane to be his wife.

It was as a result of this union that Hinematioro, the great “Queen of the East Coast,” was born. She chose Te Hoa-a-Tiki as her husband, a grandson of Te Rewai, her great uncle. Their daughter, Ngarangi-Kahiwa, married Te Rongo Pumamao, who was a great grandson of the second wife of Marakauiti, one of her own great grandfathers. Te Kani was the offspring of this marriage, and he was, therefore, the child of a union between a great grandson and a great granddaughter of Marakauiti, but who were descended from different wives. Although Te Kani had at least three wives he had no children.

The introduction of Ngunguru into Te Kani's family tree gave him the distinction of being descended from a famous couple—Tahito-kuru Maranga and Tao Putaputa—who, according to tradition, were united in wedlock after a love charm worked successfully. Tahito, it is stated, dwelt in Titirangi pa on Kaiti Hill (Gisborne) circa 1500. He visited Opotiki to court Tao, but was not received favourably by her. Upon his return home he made an atahuoi, or neck pendant. Elsdon Best considered that it might have been composed of part of a bird's skin saturated in oil expressed from the seeds of the fruit of the titoki and scented by the inclusion of fragrant leaves, moss or gum. Tahito placed the atahuoi in a ngaruru (large Trochus) shell, repeated a love charm over it, and instructed it to go quickly to Opape (near Opotiki), where Tao was in the habit of gathering pāua.

One day, whilst Tao was on the beach, the only thing that she found was the ngaruru shell, and she threw it away. No matter which part of the beach she examined, the shell turned up. When she returned to the camp fire her basket was empty, although her companions had had no difficulty in filling theirs. To her friends she remarked: “A ngaruru was the only thing I saw. Even although I moved from place to place I was followed by the shell.” Next day, when she returned to the beach, there was the faithful ngaruru, and Tao placed it in her basket.

Whilst she was sitting in front of the fire that evening she noticed the strand of the pendant, and placed it on her necklet. Soon Tahito's love began to affect her overwhelmingly. Brought close to the embers, the ngaruru is said to have opened its lips and to have told her the old, old story in the form of a lament which Tahito had composed. Said the cockle: “When Tahito flung me on the waters, he cried: ‘Tell of my love to, Tao,’ and I, now dying, am fulfilling the trust that he reposed in me.” No time was lost by Tao in hitting the Kowhai trail leading to Poverty Bay, and, soon, she was in the arms of the waiting Tahito, of whom Ngunguru, a great grandmother of Te Kani, was a descendant.

Te Kani must have owed much to Hinematioro, whose fame, on account of her kindly disposition, spread far and wide. She would never permit the slaying of anybody to provide food, no matter how meagre the supplies on hand. When Marsden was at Rangihoua in 1820 he met a young East Coast captive woman, who claimed to be a niece of “Hina, a great Queen,” of whom, he said, he had often heard.

Like some other distinguished figures in Māoridom, Hinematioro met a violent death. Pakira, who resided in the Waiapu district, was insulted by a brother-in-law named Whakarara, whose abode was at Marahea. When Whakarara heard that Pakira was on the way to attack his pa, he went to Tolaga Bay to secure the protection of Hinematioro, leaving behind a message for Pakira that he should be well content with the sands of Anaura for utu (compensation). Pakira, however, continued to pursue Whakarara, who took refuge on Pourewa Island.

When Pourewa pa was about to fall into Pakira's hands Hinematioro was assisted down a cliff and placed in a canoe, which made off towards Whangara Island. W. L. Williams was told that the canoe upset, and that Te Kani was the only survivor. Smith says that her remains were buried on Whangara Island. When the ownership of Pourewa Island was being investigated by Judges Heale and O'Brien in July, 1881, evidence was tendered to the effect that the canoe was overtaken, and that Hinematioro was taken back to the island, where she was slain and her heart was roasted and eaten. This event occurred circa 1823.

Biography 
NB: This section is derived from text in  available here at the New Zealand Electronic Text Centre.

D'Urville, commander of the French vessel L'Astrolabe, which visited Tolaga Bay in 1827, gives the earliest pen-picture of Te Kani. It seems that, at the outset, he allowed on board only Te Rangui-Wai-Hetouma (Rangiuia), who claimed to be the principal rangatira of the district. Next day some other chiefs were denied a like privilege, “although with visible repugnance.” One of them (Te Kani) would not obey the sentinel, and, trembling with rage, left only when peremptorily ordered by D'Urville to do so. He was hardly 30 years old, and became known to the voyagers as “Shaki.”

On account of Te Kani's stature and haughty appearance, and the air of submission adopted by those who surrounded him, it soon became obvious that he was a chief. Moreover, a young woman in his canoe, who spoke a mixture of English and Māori, kept on repeating, with extraordinary volubility, that Shaki, her master, was a great chief and friend of the English, and that it was very bad on D'Urville's part not to receive him. As Rangiuia admitted that Shaki was a great chief, D'Urville signalled him to come on board, and, after explaining to him that he had not been aware of his high birth, made him a few gifts. Soon they became the best of friends.

Shortly afterwards an uproar arose when another canoe appeared with two old and more heavily tattooed chiefs. Te Kani invited D'Urville to frighten them away; he even went so far as to demand a musket so that he could fire at them. When the newcomers accepted an invitation to go on board, however, Te Kani adopted a very modest demeanour towards them, offering them some large hatchets which he had received as gifts. Suddenly the elderly chiefs left the ship. When D'Urville sought an explanation, he was told that Te Kani and his companions had given the hatchets to the chiefs to let them know they were going to be killed.

According to Smith, Te Kani was “one of those great chiefs who seemed more like the arikis of Central Polynesia than were usually found in New Zealand.” Major Ropata Wahawaha claimed that “all the lines of Maori aristocratic descent converged in Te Kani; that he could trace his ancestors back to Māui-Potiki, and that his mana (authority) extended from Whangaparaoa to Mahia.” Polack, who first met Te Kani at Tolaga Bay in June, 1835, describes him as noble in appearance, above 6 feet tall, and about 36 years old. He adds: “His handsome countenance was but little marked with the moko, and was garnished with a large, dark, bushy beard, which gave him the appearance of an Arab of Mocha.”

Following the signing of the Treaty of Waitangi (te Tiriti), Henry Williams arrived in Poverty Bay on 8 April 1840 on the ship Ariel with a Māori-language copy of te Tiriti ('Tūranga Treaty copy'). Between 5 May and 9 June 1840, William Williams, presented the Tūranga Treaty copy to rangatira at Tūranga, Uawa, Wakawitirā, Rangitukia and Tokomaru so that those East Coast chiefs could sign; 41 signatures appear on the Tūranga Treaty copy, a number of important rangatira refused to sign, including Te Kani.

Sir Donald McLean, who met Te Kani in Poverty Bay in 1851, says, in his journal (Alexander Turnbull Library), that Te Kani frankly welcomed him, “although he was taken rather by surprise when I got up to him.” His only emblem of chieftainship was “a bone mere decorated with tapes of hair about the handle, which he waved carelessly about in his right hand as he rode on horseback.” McLean adds, inter alia: “He is a fine, nice-looking man, but not strikingly so—not nearly so much determination in his features as Te Hapuku possesses, nor even so much of the gentleman in appearance as Te Rawiri, a cousin of his at Turanganui—but, in reality, he is freely acknowledged by all the natives to be one of the greatest men on this side of the island.”

In an address at Gisborne in 1901, Joseph Goadby Baker (who was taken to Tolaga Bay by his parents in 1843) described Te Kani as “a man of princely appearance, tall and handsome, with curly, auburn hair and possessing all the qualities of one of Nature's gentlemen.” Te Kani, he said, was looked upon as sacred by his people, and, he could sway them by a word or a wave of the hand. He was a great friend of the Europeans, and put off all restraint whilst in their company. Although such a good friend to the missionaries, he never accepted Christianity, nor would he attend public worship. Mr. Baker added: “Unfortunately, he became addicted to strong drink, which brought him to an untimely end.”

It is stated by Smith that Te Kani took part in a battle which was fought on the banks of the Waipaoa River in 1820–21, when Ngāpuhi, under Te Wera and Tītore, and war parties of Waikato and Ngati-Maniapoto crushed Rongowhakaata and their allies. The slain included three of his brothers (or, perhaps, cousins), and he escaped only by jumping into a canoe and paddling for dear life to a pa at the mouth of the river. This engagement does not appear in E. F. Harris's list of battles fought in Poverty Bay, and no reference to it has been found in the Native Land Court minute books. Nor are any details available concerning a battle in Poverty Bay in which, according to Polack, Te Kani was taken prisoner, and, afterwards, “formed a serail from the families of his captors.”

Te Kani died on Paremata block (Tolaga Bay) in 1856 after a lingering illness. By stages his body was taken to Whangara. Some accounts state that the burial took, place, first of all, in the village, and that, subsequently, the remains were removed on to the island. However, Richard Leach, of Whangara, pointed out to Joseph Angus Mackay a clump of trees to the north-east of the village, which, he said, sheltered Te Kani's last resting place.

Māori Kingship 
NB: This section is derived from text in  available here at the New Zealand Electronic Text Centre.

Many conjectures have been made as to why the Poverty Bay and East Coast tribes stood aloof from the Māori King Movement in 1856 and 1857, seeing that most of their members denied allegiance to Queen Victoria. Mr. Wardell, R.M., was of the opinion that it was because they were jealous of the Waikato tribes. He says that the chiefs along the East Coast did discuss the propriety of appointing a king of their own, but that rivalry among the principal leaders prevented them from doing so. Te Kani had died in 1856.

James Cowan informed Joseph Angus Mackay that, when Tamihana Kuta and Matene te Whiwhi began their crusade in 1852 in support of the appointment of a Maori king, Te Kani was, he understood, the first great chief to whom the kingship was offered. At any rate, his name was mentioned as that of a suitable chief for the position. Personally, he had never made any inquiries on the subject from East Coast Māori. He added that Pōtatau Te Wherowhero was chosen at Taupo in 1856, and that his appointment was confirmed in the Waikato in 1857. On the other hand, the Rev. T. S. Grace (then stationed at Pukawa, Taupo) states, in his annual report for 1856, that no selection was made at the Maori Congress in 1856. He adds: “Our great chief (Te Heuheu), whom they wished to appoint, declared himself on the side of the Queen.”

Among East Coast Māori it is firmly believed that Te Kani was approached. One of their versions states that the envoys were Tamihana and Matene and another that Te Heuheu himself visited Uawa. No reference to any such visit appears in the writings either of W. Williams or of W. L. Williams. J. G. Baker (a son of the Rev. Charles Baker) was emphatic that, long before hostilities broke out in Taranaki or in Waikato, deputations from Taupo, Waikato and elsewhere visited Te Kani, whose reply was that it would be impossible for anyone to confer upon him a title greater than that which was his birthright, and, therefore, he could not accept any new—and what to him would be only a hollow—title.

A monster rūnanga (discussion) was held at Poverty Bay on 21 May 1858. Mr Wardell described it to the Governor as “the most influential and most numerously attended that has taken place since my arrival.” In none of the speeches was there support for the Queen's authority. All that the leaders were prepared to receive from Europeans was Christianity. Rutene Piwaka complained about the changes that had been made in the prayer book. “The first prayer book,” he said, “contained a prayer for the rangatira Maori and their families. In the second edition the prayer was for the Queen and the rangatira Maori. The prayer in the third edition was for the Queen and her family alone. Let the pakehas pray for the Queen if they like, but we will not call her our Queen, nor will we recognise her authority.” There was a general feeling that the magistrate should be withdrawn.

The position grew steadily worse. In April, 1859, delegates from East Cape attended a meeting at Pawhakairo (H.B.) at which Tamihana was present. All the tribes were advised to cancel all leases to Pākehā and to repurchase lands that had been parted with. Some of the Hawke's Bay chiefs proved unwilling to relinquish the rents which they were receiving. Towards the end of the year, Lands Commissioner Bell visited Poverty Bay, but his efforts to settle the outstanding land claims disputes were negligible, on account of the hostility of the Repudiationists, of whom he regarded Lazarus as the ringleader.

References

Sources
 
 

1790s births
1856 deaths
Te Aitanga-a-Hauiti people
Ngāti Porou people
New Zealand Māori soldiers